Władysław Konstanty, Count of Wasenau (1635 – 19 March 1698) was the illegitimate son of King of Poland Władysław IV Vasa and his mistress, Jadwiga Łuszkowska. He was the Captain of the Guard for Queen Christina of Sweden, his second cousin, while in Rome. Also in Rome, he was appointed a Papal Chamberlain for Pope Alexander VIII. Upon the death of Christina he did not receive the benefits she had intended to leave for him and was reduced to poverty.

Illegitimate children of Polish monarchs
1635 births
1698 deaths
Sons of kings